Containment is an American drama limited series, based on the Belgian television series Cordon. The series was officially ordered as a series by The CW on May 7, 2015, and aired from April 19 through July 19, 2016. Julie Plec served as executive producer, alongside David Nutter. The series follows an epidemic that breaks out in Atlanta, leaving a section of the city cordoned off under quarantine and those stuck on the inside fighting for their lives.

On May 12, 2016, The CW announced that Containment would not be renewed and would remain as a limited series.

Cast and characters

Main
Outside the Containment Zone
 David Gyasi as Major Alex "Lex" Carnahan, an officer of the Atlanta Police Department, boyfriend of Jana and best friend of Jake.
 Claudia Black as Dr. Sabine Lommers, a high ranking Doctor within the CDC who reports directly to POTUS. 
 Trevor St. John as Leonard "Leo" Greene, a reporter and conspiracy/truthlighter vlogger. 
Inside the Containment Zone
 Christina Moses as Jana Mayfield, a Data Recovery specialist, girlfriend of Lex, and ex-girlfriend of Jake.
 Chris Wood as Officer Jake Riley, an officer of the Atlanta PD and best friend of Lex.
 Kristen Gutoskie as Katie Frank, an Atlanta school teacher and mother of Quentin.
 George Young as Dr. Victor Cannerts, an Infectious Diseases doctor and working with the CDC.
 Hanna Mangan-Lawrence as Teresa Keaton, shop assistant at her mother's grocery store who is heavily pregnant by her boyfriend, Zander.

Recurring
Outside the Containment Zone
 Gregory Alan Williams as Police Chief Myles Besser
 Miles Doleac as Captain Richard Scott: A National Guard captain in charge of cordon security.
 Scott Parks as Officer Ronan Walden: An officer of the Atlanta PD
 Thom Gossom, Jr. as Roy Carnahan: Lex's father.
Inside the Containment Zone
 Zachary Unger as Quentin Frank: Katie's son.
 Sandra Ellis Lafferty as Micheline Washington: Teresa's grandmother, Leanne's mother and Bert's wife.
 Charles Black as Herbert "Bert/Bertie" Washington: Teresa's grandfather, Micheline's husband and Leanne's step-father.
 Shawn Parsons as Sam Parkes: A building maintenance officer where Jana works.
 Nadine Lewington as Suzy LeFreet: Jana's friend and co-worker.
 Tiffany Morgan as Leanne Keaton: Teresa's mother.
 Robin Spriggs as Harley O'Connor: a menace who tries to rob Leanne's grocery store twice.
 Donielle T. Hansley Jr as Thomas Graham, one of Katie's students.
 Yohance Myles as Dennis Tait, a co-worker of Jana
 John Wincer as Tony Harker, a co-worker of Jana
 Nadej K. Bailey as Britney Cole, a student of Katie's
 Mykel Shannon Jenkins as Trey Cooper, leader of a gang that puts profit before people and the brother of Cinco.
 Jordane Christie as Kelston "Cinco" Cooper, a member of Trey's gang and the brother of Trey. 
 Dan Bright as Ray Foreman, the bus driver of Katie's class's field trip and Britney's mother's boyfriend
 Adin Steckler as Mary Katzenberger, one of Katie's students
Originally Outside but now Inside the Containment Zone
 Demetrius Bridges as Zander Paulson: Teresa's boyfriend.
 Jimmy Gonzales as Officer Donald Meese: A controversial police officer.

Guest
 Ronny Matthew as Sayid Nassir, a Syrian refugee who managed to stowaway on a cargo plane to the States. He is publicly regarded as Patient 0
 Elyse Levesque as Dr. Rita Sanders, a doctor at Atlanta Midtown Hospital and first person to die from the virus
 David McKahan as Henry Burns, the boyfriend of Dr. Sanders and second person to die from the virus.

Episodes

Production
Filming for the series' pilot episode occurred in February and March 2015 in Atlanta, Georgia. Several locals were cast as extras in various scenes. In October 2015, the series was in regular production in the Atlanta area.

Broadcast
The series was broadcast on the Global Television Network in Canada, on E4 in the UK and on ProSieben in Germany. The limited series was available on Netflix in the United States between October 2016 and October 2021.

Reception
On Metacritic, the series holds an average score of 48% out of 100 based on 20 critics, indicating "mixed or average reviews". Review aggregation website Rotten Tomatoes also reported mixed critical responses, averaging a 53% rating. The website's consensus reads: "Uninspired performances and pedestrian writing make Containment just another in the long line of disaster movie scenarios we've seen played out countless times before."

References

External links
 
 

2016 American television series debuts
2016 American television series endings
2010s American drama television series
American television series based on Belgian television series
English-language television shows
Television series by Warner Bros. Television Studios
The CW original programming
Television series about viral outbreaks
Television shows set in Atlanta
Serial drama television series
Health in Georgia (U.S. state)